S.M. Dev College, Lakhipur, established in 1995, is a major and private general degree college situated in Lakhipur, Cachar district, Assam. This college is affiliated with the Assam University.

Departments

Arts
Bengali
English
History
Economics
Political Science

Proffesors
Shri Tapas Deb (Principal)
Shri Pravahkar Sinha
Dr Shimul Paul 
Dr Kalyan Sagolslem
Shrimati Nomita Devi

References

External links

Universities and colleges in Assam
Colleges affiliated to Assam University
Educational institutions established in 1995
1995 establishments in Assam